Patrakeyevka is a rural locality (a village) in Talazhskoye Rural Settlement of Primorsky District, Arkhangelsk Oblast, Russia. The population was 93 as of 2010.

Geography 
Patrakeyevka is located 63 km north of Arkhangelsk (the district's administrative centre) by road. Navolok is the nearest rural locality.

References 

Rural localities in Primorsky District, Arkhangelsk Oblast
Arkhangelsky Uyezd